KTCL (93.3 FM) is a radio station licensed to Wheat Ridge, Colorado. Owned by iHeartMedia, it broadcasts an alternative rock format targeting the Denver metro area. Its studios are located alongside iHeartMedia's other Denver stations at 4695 S Monaco St. in the Tech Center, while its transmitter is located in Golden.

The station broadcasts in HD Radio, with a subchannel carrying a punk rock format branded as Punk Tacos.

History

The station signed on in September 1965 as KFMF licensed to Fort Collins, Colorado. It simulcasted the Top 40 format of KIIX AM 600 (now on 1410, the old 600 frequency is now KCOL).  In the 1970s, the station became KIIX-FM and adopted a freeform Progressive Music format.  It changed its calls to KTCL in 1975 and evolving to the modern rock format in the mid 1980s.

KTCL, part of a joint sales agreement with KBPI and KRFX in 1995, moved to a more pop-oriented direction when KBPI began playing more new rock.  In 2001, KTCL aired the daily program Martha Quinn's Rewind along with at least four other stations owned by Clear Channel.

In 2007, KTCL changed its city of license to Wheat Ridge to provide clearer coverage over the Denver area, though it can still be received in Fort Collins.

KTCL airplay was noted for having helped launch several local alternative bands, including Love .45, Flobots, 3OH!3, The Fray, and Tickle Me Pink.

Unlike most alternative stations owned by iHeartMedia, KTCL has maintained its local programming and disc jockeys.

References

External links

IHeartMedia radio stations
Modern rock radio stations in the United States
Radio stations established in 1965
TCL
Wheat Ridge, Colorado